Podkylava is a village and municipality in Myjava District in the Trenčín Region of north-western Slovakia.

History
In historical records, the village was first mentioned in 1709.

Geography
The municipality lies at an altitude of 245 metres and covers an area of 9.955 km2. It has a population of about 250 people.

External links
 
 
http://www.statistics.sk/mosmis/eng/run.html

Villages and municipalities in Myjava District